Peucoteles is a monotypic moth genus in the family Gelechiidae. Its only species, Peucoteles herpestica, is found in Assam, India. Both the genus and species were first described by Edward Meyrick in 1931.

The larvae feed on Pinus khasia.

References

Gelechiinae